Acacia enterocarpa, commonly known as jumping jack wattle, is  a shrub species that is endemic to eastern Australia.

Description
It has ribbed, red to brown coloured branchlets that are asperulate. The pungent, rigid, glabrous, green phyllodes are subsessile and patent to inclined. It blooms between May and October and produces simple inflorescences simple in groups of one to four situated in the axils. The brown undulate seed pods that form after flowering have yellow margins.

Taxonomy
The species was first formally described by the botanist R.V.Smith in 1957 as part of the work A remarkable new Acacia for Victoria (The "Jumping-Jack" Wattle) as published in The Victorian Naturalist. It was reclassified as Racosperma enterocarpum in 2003 by Leslie Pedley then transferred back to genus Acacia in 2005.
The specific epithet is derived from the Greek words entero meaning intestines and karpos meaning fruit in reference to the shape of the seed pod. Both Acacia colletioides and Acacia nyssophylla are closely related to A. enterocarpa.

Distribution
It has a disjunct distribution through parts of south eastern South Australia and western Victoria. It is found on the southern tip of the Eyre Peninsula and Yorke Peninsula from around Curramulka and near Bordertown extending eastwards as far as to Nhill in western Victoria. It is often found as part of woodland to open forest communities and grows in sandy alkaline soils as well as neutral yellow duplex to red porous loamy soils and grey cracking clay soils.

See also
List of Acacia species
Aberdour Conservation Park
Ramsay Conservation Park

References

enterocarpa
Flora of South Australia
Flora of Victoria (Australia)
Fabales of Australia
Plants described in 1957